North Long Beach (also referred to as North Town or Northside) is a predominantly working-class area of Long Beach, California. The neighborhood is bounded to the west, north and east by the Long Beach city limits (the Rancho Dominguez unincorporated county area and the cities of Compton, Paramount, Bellflower and Lakewood), and to the south by a Union Pacific railroad track and the Bixby Knolls neighborhood. The north boundary with Paramount is only a few blocks north of the Artesia Freeway (California State Route 91).

North Long Beach is mostly residential. It is home to the Uptown Business Improvement District, which represents commercial and multifarious property owners on Atlantic Avenue between Artesia Blvd and Market Street and a portion of Artesia Blvd adjacent to Jordan High School, as well as retail activity along most major streets in the area, including Artesia Boulevard, Long Beach Boulevard, and Cherry Avenue. There are some industrial businesses, mostly along the eastern edge of North Long Beach between Cherry Avenue and Paramount Boulevard, serviced by the Union Pacific Railroad.

The northern end of the district is home to Houghton Park, the Michelle Obama Neighborhood Library, Fire Station 12, and Jordan High School, while the southern end includes the Carmelitos housing project and its adjacent small shopping center. On its west side, at approximately Market Street and Long Beach Boulevard, is the site of the original Long Beach civic center dating back to the city's rancho days.  The Long Beach Police Department's North Division operates a substation on the corner of Atlantic and Del Amo, at Scherer Park.

According to 2021 U.S. Census estimates, the neighborhood was home to over 93,000 people (roughly one-fifth of the total population of the city). Roughly 69% of the population was Hispanic, roughly 28% were black, roughly 0.9% were non-Hispanic whites, and roughly 1% were Asian.

Schools

North Long Beach is in the Long Beach Unified School District.

Jordan High School (Main Campus)
Jordan High School Plus
Charles Lindbergh Middle School
Alexander Hamilton Middle School 
Colin Powell School (K-8)
Ulysses S. Grant Elementary School
Bret Harte Elementary School
McKinley Elementary School
Starr King Elementary School
Perry Lindsey Middle School
Dooley Elementary School
Jane Addams Elementary School

Special events
 Long Beach Veterans Day Parade (Nov.)

See also
Neighborhoods of Long Beach, California

References

External links
Long Beach City Council District 9 - Rex Richardson
Inside District 9

Neighborhoods in Long Beach, California